George Pattullo is the name of:

George Pattullo (footballer) (1888–1953), Scottish footballer for FC Barcelona
George Pattullo (rugby union) (c. 1893/1894–1968), Scottish rugby union player
George Pattullo (writer) (1879–1967), Canadian writer